The 1968 All-Ireland Senior Hurling Championship Final was the 81st All-Ireland Final and the culmination of the 1968 All-Ireland Senior Hurling Championship, an inter-county hurling tournament for the top teams in Ireland. The match was held at Croke Park, Dublin, on 1 September 1968, between Wexford and Tipperary. The Munster champions lost to their Leinster opponents on a score line of 5-8 to 3-12.

Match details

All-Ireland Senior Hurling Championship Final
All-Ireland Senior Hurling Championship Final, 1968
All-Ireland Senior Hurling Championship Final
All-Ireland Senior Hurling Championship Finals
Tipperary GAA matches
Wexford GAA matches